Rui Carlos Jorge Pataca (born 8 May 1973) is a Portuguese retired football who played as a striker, and a manager.

Playing career
Born in Luanda, Portuguese Angola, Pataca only started playing professional football at the age of 22, with A.D. Ovarense in the Portuguese second division, going on to play with S.C. Covilhã in both that and the third levels.

After an impressive season with F.C. Felgueiras in division two (18 goals), he signed for C.F. Belenenses in the top flight, scoring six times during half a season, his only with the club, as he finished the campaign with Montpellier HSC in the French Ligue 1, on loan, netting a further five goals in an eventual relegation, as 18th and last.

In the 2000 summer Pataca joined the Hérault side on a permanent basis, contributing with four goals for an immediate promotion back, and being irregularly used in the following top division seasons. He subsequently stayed in the country with US Créteil-Lusitanos, playing three seasons in Ligue 2 and two in the Championnat National; after only 14 games in his last two years combined, the 36-year-old retired from football.

Manager career
After retiring, Pataca served as an assistant coach for his former club Créteil, under both Laurent Fournier and Hubert Velud. After two seasons, in May 2011, he was named manager of third level side Rodez AF.

References

External links

1973 births
Living people
Footballers from Luanda
Portuguese footballers
Association football forwards
Primeira Liga players
Liga Portugal 2 players
Louletano D.C. players
A.D. Ovarense players
S.C. Covilhã players
F.C. Felgueiras players
C.F. Os Belenenses players
Ligue 1 players
Ligue 2 players
Montpellier HSC players
US Créteil-Lusitanos players
Rodez AF managers
Portuguese expatriate footballers
Expatriate footballers in France
Portuguese expatriate sportspeople in France
Portuguese football managers